{{DISPLAYTITLE:C10H12N2O3}}
The molecular formula C10H12N2O3 (molar mass: 208.21 g/mol, exact mass: 208.0848 u) may refer to:

 Allobarbital, or allobarbitone
 Kynurenine
 Picamilon